The NATO Eurofighter 2000 and Tornado Management Agency (NETMA) is the prime customer and management body for the four-state Eurofighter Typhoon Weapon System programme. Its offices are located in Hallbergmoos, Germany and it is staffed by civilian and military secondees from the participating states – the United Kingdom, Germany, Italy and Spain. Miguel Ángel Martín Pérez was appointed the General Manager of NETMA in mid-2020. Previous General Managers include Air Vice-Marshal Graham Farnell of the British Royal Air Force and Lt. General Gabriele Salvestroni of the Italian Air Force.

NETMA was established in 1996 to replace two former organisations – the NATO Multirole Combat Aircraft Development and Production Management Agency (NAMMA) and the NATO EFA Development Production and Logistics Management Agency (NEFMA). It is responsible for the joint development and production of both the Typhoon and the NATO Multi-Role Combat Aircraft, namely the Panavia Tornado.

References

Organizations established in 1996
Eurofighter aircraft
Panavia Tornado
NATO agencies
Organisations based in Munich